Franklin Township is one of eleven townships in Ripley County, Indiana. As of the 2010 census, its population was 3,773 and it contained 1,541 housing units.

Geography

Cities and towns
 Milan (northern half)

Unincorporated towns
 Behlmer Corner
 Clinton
 Negengards Corner
 Old Milan
 Pierceville
 Stumpke Corner

Education
Franklin Township residents may obtain a free library card from the Osgood Public Library Central Library in Osgood, or its branch in Milan.

References

External links
 Indiana Township Association
 United Township Association of Indiana

Townships in Ripley County, Indiana
Townships in Indiana